The Church of San Hipólito is a Catholic church on Mexico City's Paseo de la Reforma. It was built in 1520 by Black Spaniard conquistador Juan Garrido following a battle between the Spanish colonists and the Aztecs.

See also
List of colonial churches in Mexico City

References

External links
 

Historic center of Mexico City
Paseo de la Reforma
Roman Catholic churches in Mexico City